Abdelghani Gtaib is a paralympic athlete from Morocco competing mainly in category T46 middle and long-distance events.

Abdelghani competed in the 2004 Summer Paralympics winning a silver in the 1500m and also competing in the 800m and 5000m.

References

Paralympic athletes of Morocco
Athletes (track and field) at the 2004 Summer Paralympics
Paralympic silver medalists for Morocco
Living people
Medalists at the 2004 Summer Paralympics
Year of birth missing (living people)
Paralympic medalists in athletics (track and field)
Moroccan male middle-distance runners
Moroccan male long-distance runners
20th-century Moroccan people
21st-century Moroccan people